8x8 Inc. is an American provider of Voice over IP products. Its products include cloud-based voice, contact center, video, mobile and unified communications for businesses. Since 2018, 8x8 manages Jitsi.

History
The company was founded in 1987 by Chi-Shin Wang and Y. W. Sing formerly of Weitek as Integrated Information Technology, Inc., or IIT. The name was changed in the mid-1990s. According to the company, IIT began as an integrated circuit designer. The company produced math coprocessors for x86 microprocessors, as well as Graphics accelerator cards for the personal computer market during the late 1980s. The company later changed its name to 8x8, and began producing products for the videoconferencing market.

8x8 went public on the NASDAQ market in 1997. The company moved their trading to NYSE in 2017, under the ticker symbol EGHT. In 1999, 8x8 acquired two companies, Odisei and U|Force, to acquire network and server VoIP technologies.

In March 2000, 8x8 relaunched itself as a VoIP service provider under the name Netergy Networks. The company changed its name back to 8x8 in July 2001. 8x8 began trading on the Nasdaq SmallCap Market on 26 July 2002. The company's stock was listed on the New York Stock Exchange for a time before switching back to Nasdaq in November 2022.

In 2003, the company launched a videophone service. In July 2007, after startup SunRocket was liquidated, 8x8 entered an agreement to accept 200,000 of its customers.

Gartner has listed 8x8 several times as a Leader for UCaaS (Unified Communications as a Service) within its Gartner Magic Quadrant, a series of technology market reports. 8x8 has been awarded 128 patents related to semiconductors, computer architecture, video processing algorithms, videophones and communications technologies and security.

In 2018, the company acquired Jitsi and Jitsi Meet.

Acquisitions 
In May 2010, 8x8 acquired Central Host, a California-based managed hosting company. In June 2011, the company announced the acquisition of Zerigo, a Colorado-based cloud services company. In September 2011, 8x8 acquired Contactual, a hosted contact center company. In 2013, it acquired United Kingdom-based Voicenet, another cloud services company.

In May 2015 8x8 acquired privately held UK-based DXI Ltd., a cloud-based contact center solutions vendor for $26 million in cash and stock. The same month, 8x8 announced the acquisition of MarianaIQ (MIQ), to transform both employee and customer experience. The following month, the company acquired assets of the privately held Quality Software Corp. (QSC) as well as two affiliated companies.

In October 2018, 8x8 acquired Jitsi, an open source, tool for chat and video conferencing, from Atlassian.

In July 2019, it acquired Wavecell, a CPaaS (communications platform as a service) provider headquartered in Singapore.

In Jan 2020, 8x8 acquired the Finnish startup, callstats.io, a SaaS call quality monitoring service that measures call quality in WebRTC apps.

See also 
8x8 has a number of notable competitors in the market:
 Charter Communications
 Vonage
 RingCentral
 Nextiva
 Bandwidth
 Dialpad

References

External links
 

1997 initial public offerings
American companies established in 1987
Companies based in Campbell, California
Companies formerly listed on the New York Stock Exchange
Companies listed on the Nasdaq
Telecommunications companies established in 1987
VoIP companies of the United States